Body Rhythm  is the fourth album by Marion Meadows, released in 1995.

Track listing
"My Cherie Amour" - 4:04
"Be With You" - 5:33
"South Beach" - 5:21
"Later On" - 1:24
"Get Involved" - 4:47
"One More Chance" - 4:57
"Kool" - 4:40
"Marion's Theme" - 5:21
"Wanna Be Loved By You" - 3:53
"Body Rhythm" - 5:59
"Deep Waters" - 5:41
"Summer's Over" - 6:28
"The Lift" - 4:34

References

External links
Album at Last.fm

1995 albums
Marion Meadows albums